Sarangapani Raman (1920 – 11 January 1991) was an Indian footballer who played for the Mysore State Police football team. He also represented India at the 1948 Summer Olympics.

Playing career
Raman played predominantly as a striker, and was included in Balaidas Chatterjee managed national team squad ahead of the 1948 Summer Olympics. For preparation before the min tournament, India toured to Europe in July and played against few English clubs. He is best known for playing in the Indian national football team's first ever match and scoring independent India's first ever international goal at the 1948 Olympics against France. The match ended 2–1 in favor of France. This was also noted as India's first ever official match after independence.

In domestic club football, he played for Mysore State Police. He later moved to Calcutta Football League side Mohun Bagan and was part of the team that won Durand Cup in 1953 defeating National Defense Academy.

Managerial career
Raman was one of the visionaries of women's football in the southern part of India, predominantly in Karnataka. During his coaching years, he scouted the national players like Chitra Gangadharan, Gayatri Ponappa and Brinda.

Honours

Mohun Bagan
Durand Cup: 1953

See also

History of the India national football team
India national football team at the Olympics
History of Indian football

References

Bibliography

External links
 
Sarangapani Raman's profile at Sports Reference.com

1920 births
1991 deaths
Footballers from Bangalore
Indian footballers
India international footballers
Olympic footballers of India
Footballers at the 1948 Summer Olympics
Association football forwards
Mohun Bagan AC players
Calcutta Football League players